Katie Anne Schumacher-Cawley (born March 10, 1980) is an American former volleyball and basketball player and is the head coach of the Penn State women's volleyball team. After serving as the associate head coach since 2018, she was named head coach on January 10, 2022, following Russ Rose's retirement from coaching.

Career
Prior to being named the head coach at Penn State, Schumacher-Cawley was the head coach at UIC and Penn 

A 2002 graduate of Penn State, she was a two-time American Volleyball Coaches Association (AVCA) All-American, three-time All-Big Ten selection, and three-time AVCA All-Region selection volleyball player for the Nittany Lions. She was a member of the 1999 NCAA national championship Team and also played basketball for the Lady Lions basketball team in 2001–2002.  Schumacher-Cawley ended her Penn State career with 1,310 kills, 772 digs and 299 blocks.

A native of Chicago, Illinois, she was inducted into Chicagoland Sports Hall of Fame in 2008 and was named to the Girls Catholic Athletic Conference Hall of Fame in 2003. 

In her first season as Penn State's head coach in 2022, the team went undefeated in its pre conference season, starting at 11–0, despite having lost 7 starters from the previous season to graduation or transferring. Penn State went 13–7 in conference play, finishing in 5th place. Furher, in 2022, she coached several players to conference and national recognition. In the Big Ten, senior outside hitter Kashauna Williams and junior middle blocker Allie Holland were named to first team, while senior setter Seleisa Elisaia were named to the second team. Freshman outside hitter Alexa Markley rounded out conference awards by being named to the All-Freshman team, and graduate student middle blocker Katie Clark earned the sportsmanship honor. Penn State went 13–7 in conference play, finishing in 5th place.  In the NCAA postseason, Penn State earned the #4 seed in the Wisconsin regional. She was the only first year head coach in 2022 to lead her team to the Sweet 16 in the NCAA tournament. Moreover, Seleisa Elisaia, Allie Holland, and Kashauna Williams were recognized as AVCA all region first team players.

Head coaching record

External links
Penn State head coach profile

References

1980 births
Living people
American volleyball coaches
American women's volleyball players
Penn State Nittany Lions women's volleyball players
Penn State Lady Lions basketball players
Penn State Nittany Lions women's volleyball coaches
Illinois Fighting Illini women's volleyball coaches
Sportspeople from Chicago